Anolis carpenteri, also known commonly as Carpenter's anole or the carpenter anole is a species of lizard in the family Dactyloidae. The species is endemic to Central America.

Etymology
The specific name, carpenteri, is in honor of American herpetologist Charles Congden Carpenter.

Description
A. carpenteri is a small, green lizard with an orange dewlap and smooth ventral scales.

Habitat
Carpenter's anole prefers relatively open habitat in the lowland interface between land and watercourses, and is adapted for climbing on lichen-covered rocks, tree trunks, and shrubs.

Geographic range
A. carpenteri is found in Costa Rica, Nicaragua, and Panama. In Costa Rica it is found in Amistad Caribe, Huetar Norte, Cordillera Volcanica Central, Guanacaste, Tortuguero.

The type locality is Río Reventazón, Turrialba, Cartago Province, Costa Rica.

Diet
A. carpenteri feeds on arthropods, primarily insects.

Reproduction
A. carpenteri is oviparous.

References

Further reading
Guyer C, Savage JM (1986). "Cladistic relationships among anoles (Sauria: Iguanidae)". Systematic Zoology 35: 509-531. (Norops carpenteri, new combination).
Köhler G (2000). Reptilien und Amphibien Mittelamerikas, Band 1: Krokodile, Schildkröten, Echsen [= Central American Reptiles and Amphibians, Volume 1: Crocodiles, Turtles, Lizards]. Offenbach, Germany: Herpeton. 158 pp. . (in German).
Savage JM (2002). The Amphibians and Reptiles of Costa Rica: A Herpetofauna between Two Continents, between Two Seas. Chicago and London: University of Chicago Press. 954 pp. .

Anoles
Lizards of Central America
Lizards of South America
Reptiles of Colombia
Reptiles of Costa Rica
Reptiles of Nicaragua
Reptiles of Panama
Least concern biota of North America
Least concern biota of South America
Reptiles described in 1971
Taxa named by Anthony A. Echelle